Prasophyllum regium, commonly known as the king leek orchid, is a species of orchid endemic to the south-west of Western Australia. It has a single, unusually thick tubular leaf and up to one hundred relatively large, greenish-brown or burgundy-coloured flowers.

Description
As with others in the genus, the flowers are inverted so that the labellum is above the column rather than below it. A fleshy, shiny green callus covers most of the labellum, reaching almost to its tip. Flowering occurs from September to December.

Taxonomy and naming
Prasophyllum regium was first formally described in 1918 by Richard Sanders Rogers from a specimen collected near Manjimup and the description was published in Transactions, proceedings and report, Royal Society of South Australia. The specific epithet (regium) is a Latin word meaning "kingly" or "royal" referring to the tall flowering stem.

Distribution and habitat
The king leek orchid is found between Perth and Albany in the Jarrah Forest, Swan Coastal Plain and Warren biogeographic regions, growing in a wide range of habitats from seasonal swamps to dense forests.

Conservation
Prasophyllum regium is listed as "Not Threatened" by the Western Australian Government Department of Parks and Wildlife.

References

External links 
 

regium
Orchids of Western Australia
Endemic orchids of Australia
Plants described in 1918
Endemic flora of Western Australia